The N3 road is one of the national roads of Senegal. It connects the west and the east of the country by a direct route across the middle from Thiès in the west via Bambey, Diourbel, Mbacké, Touba, Dahra, Linguère and Ranérou to Ouro Sogui and Malem on the eastern border with Mauritania. The N3 connects with the N2 road at both ends (Thiès and Ouro Sogui).

See also
 N1 road
 N2 road
 N4 road
 N5 road
 N6 road
 N7 road
 Transport in Senegal

Road transport in Senegal